Matea Vrdoljak (born November 19, 1985) is a Croatian female basketball player.

External links
Profile at eurobasket.com

1985 births
Living people
Basketball players from Split, Croatia
Croatian women's basketball players
Shooting guards
ŽKK Novi Zagreb players